Sar Cheshmeh is a village in Yanqaq Rural District in the Central District of Galikash County, Golestan Province, Iran. At the 2006 census, its population was 541, in 115 families.

References 

Populated places in Galikash County